SS United States is a retired ocean liner built between 1950 and 1951 for the United States Lines at a cost of  (equivalent to $ million in ). The ship is the largest ocean liner constructed entirely in the United States and the fastest ocean liner to cross the Atlantic in either direction, retaining the Blue Riband for the highest average speed since her maiden voyage in 1952; she still holds the title today. She was designed by American naval architect William Francis Gibbs and could be converted into a troopship if required by the Navy in time of war. United States maintained an uninterrupted schedule of transatlantic passenger service until 1969 and was never used as a troopship.

The ship has been sold several times since the 1970s, with each new owner trying unsuccessfully to make the liner profitable. Eventually, the ship's fittings were sold at auction, and hazardous wastes, including asbestos panels throughout the ship, were removed, leaving her almost completely stripped by 1994. Two years later, she was towed to Pier 82 on the Delaware River, in Philadelphia, where she remains today.

Since 2009, a preservation group called the SS United States Conservancy has been raising funds to save the ship. The group purchased her in 2011 and has drawn up several unrealized plans to restore the ship, one of which included turning the ship into a multi-purpose waterfront complex. In 2015, as its funds dwindled, the group began accepting bids to scrap the ship; however, sufficient donations came in via extended fundraising. Large donations have kept the ship berthed at her Philadelphia dock while the group continues to further investigate restoration plans.

Design and construction

Designed by American naval architect and marine engineer William Francis Gibbs (1886–1967), the liner's construction was a joint effort by the United States Navy and United States Lines. The US government underwrote $50 million of the $78 million construction cost, with the ship's prospective operators, United States Lines, contributing the remaining $28 million. In exchange, the ship was designed to be easily converted in times of war to a troopship. The ship has a capacity of 15,000 troops, and could also be converted to a hospital ship.

The vessel was constructed from 1950 to 1952 at the Newport News Shipbuilding and Drydock Company in Newport News, Virginia. The hull was constructed in a dry dock. United States was built to exacting Navy specifications, which required that the ship be heavily compartmentalized, and have separate engine rooms to optimize wartime survival. A large part of the construction was prefabricated. The ship's hull comprised 183,000 pieces.

The construction of the ship's superstructure involved the most extensive use of aluminum in any construction project up to that time, which posed a galvanic corrosion challenge to the builders in joining the aluminum superstructure to the steel decks below. However, the extensive use of aluminum meant significant weight savings, as well. United States had the most powerful steam turbines of any merchant marine vessel at the time, with a total power of  delivered to four -diameter manganese-bronze propellers.

Interior design
The goal was to "create a modern fresh contemporary look that emphasized simplicity over palatial, restrained elegance over glitz and glitter". They would also hire artists to produce American themed artwork for the public spaces, including Hildreth Meière, Louis Ross, Peter Ostuni, Charles Lin Tissot, William King, Charles Gilbert, Raymond Wendell, Nathaniel Choate, muralist Austin M. Purves, Jr., and sculptor Gwen Lux. Interior décor also included a children's playroom designed by Edward Meshekoff. Markwald and Urquhart were also tasked with the challenge of creating interiors that were completely fireproof.

Fire safety

To minimize the risk of fire, the designers of United States prescribed using no wood in the ship's framing, accessories, decorations, or interior surfaces, although the galley did feature a wooden butcher's block. Fittings, including all furniture and fabrics, were custom made in glass, metal, and spun-glass fiber, to ensure compliance with fireproofing guidelines set by the US Navy. Asbestos-laden paneling was used extensively in interior structures. The clothes hangers in the luxury cabins were aluminum. The ballroom's grand piano was originally designed to be aluminum, but was made from mahogany and accepted only after a demonstration in which gasoline was poured upon the wood and ignited, without the wood itself ever catching fire.

History

Commercial service (1952–1969)

In New York her owners were awarded the Hales Trophy, the tangible expression of the Blue Riband competition. 

The maximum speed attained by United States is disputed, as it was once held as a military secret. The issue stems from an alleged speed of  that was leaked to reporters by engineers after the first speed trial. In a 1991 issue of Popular Mechanics, author Mark G. Carbonaro wrote that while she could do , that speed was never actually attained.

During the 1950s and early 1960s the United States was popular for transatlantic travel. She attracted frequent repeat celebrity passengers, such as the Duke and Duchess of Windsor, along with celebrities like Marilyn Monroe, Judy Garland, Cary Grant, Salvador Dalí, Duke Ellington, and Walt Disney, who featured the ship in the 1962 film Bon Voyage!. Another celebrity who was on board the ship was Claude Jones, a trombonist who played with the aforementioned Ellington. He worked as part of the waitstaff, and died on board, also in 1962.

By the mid-to-late 1960s, with the advent of jet-powered airliners, the market for transatlantic travel by ship had dwindled. America was sold in 1964, Queen Mary was retired in 1967, and Queen Elizabeth in 1968. United States was no longer profitable. Unbeknownst to her passengers, crew, or the public, United States completed her last voyage (Number 400) on November 7, 1969, when she arrived in New York.

In late 1969, before the decision was made to retire the SS United States, United States Lines announced a 55-day Grand Pacific Cruise which was to set sail on January 21, 1970; however, this was canceled in December 1969.

Layup in Virginia and visit to Europe (1969–1996)
After this voyage, the liner sailed to Newport News for her scheduled annual overhaul. While there, the United States Lines announced its decision to withdraw her from service. The decision was due to the skyrocketing expenses of operating the ship and the U.S. government's discontinuation of its operating subsidies. The announcement halted all work on the ship, leaving various tasks incomplete, like the repainting of the funnels; the partially finished paint coating on the funnels can still be faintly seen today. The ship was sealed up, with all furniture, fittings, and crew uniforms left in place.

In June 1970, the ship was relocated across the James River, to the Norfolk International Terminal, in Norfolk, Virginia. In 1973, the United States Lines officially transferred ownership of the vessel to the United States Maritime Administration. In 1976, Norwegian Caribbean Cruise Line (NCL) was reported to be interested in purchasing the ship and converting her into a Caribbean cruise ship, but the U.S. Maritime Administration refused the sale due to the classified naval design elements of the ship and NCL purchased the former  instead. The Navy finally declassified the ship's design features in 1977. That same year, a group headed by Harry Katz sought to purchase the ship and dock her in Atlantic City, New Jersey, where she would be used as a hotel and casino. However, nothing came of the plan. United States was briefly considered by the US Navy to be converted into a troopship or a hospital ship, to be called USS United States. This plan never materialized, being dropped in favor of converting two San Clemente class supertankers. The liner was seen as obsolete for Naval use by 1978, and was put up for sale by the U.S. Maritime Administration.

In 1980, the vessel was sold for $5 million to a group headed by Seattle developer Richard H. Hadley, who hoped to revitalize the liner in a time share cruise ship format. 

In 1984, to pay creditors, the ship's fittings and furniture, which had been left in place since the ship was sealed in 1969, were sold at auction in Norfolk, Virginia. After a week-long auction from October 8–14, 1984, about 3,000 bidders paid $1.65 million for objects from the ship. Some of the artwork and furniture went to various museums including the Mariners' Museum of Newport News, while the largest collection was installed at the now defunct Windmill Point Restaurant in Nags Head, North Carolina. 

On March 4, 1989, the vessel was relocated, towed across Hampton Roads to the CSX coal pier in Newport News.

Richard Hadley's plan of a time-share style cruise ship eventually failed financially, and the ship, which had been seized by US marshals, was put up for auction by the U.S. Maritime Administration on April 27, 1992. At auction, Marmara Marine Inc.—which was headed by Edward Cantor and Fred Mayer, but with Julide Sadıkoğlu, of the Turkish shipping family, as majority owner—purchased the ship for $2.6 million.

The ship was towed to Turkey, departing the US on June 4, 1992 and reaching the Sea of Marmara on July 9. She was then towed to Ukraine, where, in Sevastopol Shipyard, she underwent asbestos removal which lasted from 1993 to 1994. The interior of the ship was almost completely stripped down to the bulkheads during this time. Her open lifeboats which would not meet new SOLAS requirements if the ship were to sail again were also removed and scrapped along with their davits.

In the U.S., no plans could be finalized for repurposing the vessel, and in June 1996, she was towed back across the Atlantic, to South Philadelphia.

Layup in Philadelphia (1996–present)
In November 1997, Edward Cantor purchased the ship for $6 million. Two years later, the SS United States Foundation and the SS United States Conservancy (then known as the SS United States Preservation Society, Inc.) succeeded in having the ship placed on the National Register of Historic Places.

Purchase by Norwegian Cruise Line
In 2003, Norwegian Cruise Line (NCL) purchased the ship at auction from Cantor's estate, after his death. NCL's intent was to fully restore the ship to a service role in their newly announced American-flagged Hawaiian passenger service called NCL America. United States was one of the few ships eligible to enter such service because of the Passenger Service Act, which requires that any vessel engaged in domestic commerce be built and flagged in the U.S. and operated by a predominantly American crew. NCL began an extensive technical review in late 2003, after which they stated that the ship was in sound condition. The cruise line cataloged over 100 boxes of the ship's blueprints. In August 2004, NCL commenced feasibility studies regarding a new build-out of the vessel; and in May 2006, Tan Sri Lim Kok Thay, chairman of Malaysia-based Star Cruises (the owner of NCL), stated that United States would be coming back as the fourth ship for NCL after refurbishment. Meanwhile, the Windmill Point restaurant, which had contained some of the original furniture from the ship, closed in 2007. The furniture was donated to the Mariners' Museum and Christopher Newport University, both in Newport News, Virginia.

NCL America later withdrew Pride of Aloha and Pride of Hawaii from its Hawaiian service. In February 2009, it was reported that United States would "soon be listed for sale".

Founding of the SS United States Conservancy and threat of scrapping
The SS United States Conservancy was then created that year as a group trying to save United States by raising funds to purchase her. On July 30, 2009, H. F. Lenfest, a Philadelphia media entrepreneur and philanthropist, pledged a matching grant of $300,000 to help the United States Conservancy purchase the vessel from Star Cruises. A noteworthy supporter, former US president Bill Clinton, has also endorsed rescue efforts to save the ship, having sailed on her himself in 1968.

In March 2010, it was reported that bids for the ship, to be sold for scrap, were being accepted. Norwegian Cruise Lines, in a press release, noted that there were large costs associated with keeping United States afloat in her current state—around $800,000 a year—and that, as the SS United States Conservancy was not able to tender an offer for the ship, the company was actively seeking a "suitable buyer". By May 7, 2010, over $50,000 was raised by the SS United States Conservancy.

In November 2010, the Conservancy announced a plan to develop a "multi-purpose waterfront complex" with hotels, restaurants, and a casino along the Delaware River in South Philadelphia at the proposed location of the stalled Foxwoods Casino project. The results of a detailed study of the site were revealed in late November 2010, in advance of Pennsylvania's December 10, 2010, deadline for a deal aimed at Harrah's Entertainment taking over the casino project. However, the Conservancy's deal soon collapsed, when on December 16, 2010, the Gaming Control Board voted to revoke the casino's license.

Saved by the SS United States Conservancy
The Conservancy eventually bought United States from NCL in February 2011 for a reported $3 million with the help of money donated by philanthropist H.F. Lenfest. The group had funds to last 20 months (from July 1, 2010) that were to go to supporting a development plan to clean the ship of toxins and make the ship financially self-supporting, possibly as a hotel or other development project. SS United States Conservancy executive director Dan McSweeney stated that he planned on placing the ship at possible locations that include Philadelphia, New York City, and Miami.

The SS United States Conservancy assumed ownership of United States on February 1, 2011. Talks about possibly locating the ship in Philadelphia, New York City, or Miami continued into March. In New York City, negotiations with a developer were underway for the ship to become part of Vision 2020, a waterfront redevelopment plan costing $3.3 billion. In Miami, Ocean Group, in Coral Gables, was interested in putting the ship in a slip on the north side of American Airlines Arena. With an additional $5.8 million donation from H. F. Lenfest, the conservancy had about 18 months from March 2011 to make the ship a public attraction. On August 5, 2011, the SS United States Conservancy announced that after conducting two studies focused on placing the ship in Philadelphia, she was "not likely to work there for a variety of reasons". However, discussions to locate the ship at her original home port of New York, as a stationary attraction, were reported to be ongoing. The Conservancy's grant specifies that the refit and restoration must be done in the Philadelphia Naval Shipyard for the benefit of the Philadelphia economy, regardless of her eventual mooring site.

On February 7, 2012, preliminary work began on the restoration project to prepare the ship for her eventual rebuild, although a contract had not yet been signed. In April 2012, a Request for Qualifications (RFQ) was released as the start of an aggressive search for a developer for the ship. A Request for Proposals (RFP) was issued in May. In July 2012, the SS United States Conservancy launched a new online campaign called "Save the United States", a blend of social networking and micro-fundraising that allowed donors to sponsor square inches of a virtual ship for redevelopment, while allowing them to upload photos and stories about their experience with the ship. The Conservancy announced that donors to the virtual ship would be featured in an interactive "Wall of Honor" aboard the future SS United States museum.

By the end of 2012, a developer was to be chosen, who would put the ship in a selected city by summer 2013. In November 2013, it was reported that the ship was undergoing a "below-the-deck" makeover, which lasted into 2014, in order to make the ship more appealing to developers as a dockside attraction. The SS United States Conservancy was warned that if its plans were not realized quickly, there might be no choice but to sell the ship for scrap. In January 2014, obsolete pieces of the ship were sold to keep up with the $80,000-a-month maintenance costs. Enough money was raised to keep the ship going for another six months, with the hope of finding someone committed to the project, New York City still being the likeliest location.

In August 2014, the ship was still moored in Philadelphia and costs for the ship's rent amounted to $60,000 a month. It was estimated that it would take $1 billion to return United States to service on the high seas, although a 2016 estimate for restoration as a luxury cruise ship was said to be, "as much as $700 million". On September 4, 2014, a final push was made to have the ship bound for New York City. A developer interested in re-purposing the ship as a major waterfront destination made an announcement regarding the move. The Conservancy had only weeks to decide if the ship needed to be sold for scrap. On December 15, 2014, preliminary agreements in support of the redevelopment of United States were announced. The agreements included providing for three months of carrying costs, with a timeline and more details to be released sometime in 2015. In February 2015, another $250,000 was received by the Conservancy from an anonymous donor which went towards planning an onboard museum.

In October 2015, the SS United States Conservancy began exploring potential bids for scrapping the ship. The group was running out of money to cover the $60,000-per-month cost to dock and maintain the ship. Attempts to re-purpose the ship continued. Ideas included using the ship for hotels, restaurants, or office space. One idea was to install computer servers in the lower decks and link them to software development businesses in office space on the upper decks. However, no firm plans were announced. The conservancy said that if no progress was made by October 31, 2015, they would have no choice but to sell the ship to a "responsible recycler". As the deadline passed it was announced that $100,000 had been raised in October 2015, sparing the ship from immediate danger. By November 23, 2015, it was reported that over $600,000 in donations had been received for care and upkeep, buying time well into the coming year for the SS United States Conservancy to press ahead with a plan to redevelop the vessel.

Crystal Cruises purchase option
On February 4, 2016, Crystal Cruises announced that it had signed a purchase option for United States. Crystal would cover docking costs, in Philadelphia, for nine months while conducting a feasibility study on returning the ship to service as a cruise ship based in New York City. On April 9, 2016, it was announced that 600 artifacts from United States would be returned to the ship from the Mariners' Museum and other donors.

On August 5, 2016, the plan was formally dropped, with Crystal Cruises citing the presence of too many technical and commercial challenges. The cruise line then made a donation of $350,000 to help with preservation through the end of the year. The SS United States Conservancy continued to receive donations, which included one for $150,000 by cruise industry executive Jim Pollin. In January 2018, the conservancy made an appeal to US president Donald Trump to take action regarding "America's Flagship". If the group runs out of money, alternative plans for the ship include sinking her as an artificial reef rather than scrapping her.

On September 20, 2018, the conservancy consulted with Damen Ship Repair & Conversion about redevelopment of United States. Damen had converted the former ocean liner and cruise ship  into a hotel and mixed-use development.

RXR Realty redevelopment plans
On December 10, 2018, the conservancy announced an agreement with the commercial real estate firm RXR Realty, of New York City, to explore options for restoring and redeveloping the ocean liner. In 2015, RXR had expressed interest in developing an out-of-commission ocean liner as a hotel and event venue at Pier 57 in New York. RXR's press release about United States stated that multiple locations would be considered, depending on the viability of restoration plans.

In March 2020, RXR Realty announced its plans to repurpose the ocean liner as a permanently-moored  hospitality and cultural space, requesting expressions of interest from a number of major US waterfront cities including Boston, New York, Philadelphia, Miami, Seattle, San Francisco, Los Angeles, and San Diego.

2021 Pier 82 rent increase
A dispute over the 2021 increase of Pier 82's daily rent, from US$850 to US$1700, as well as US$160,000 in unpaid back rent, could cause the ship to lose her berth.

Artifacts

Artwork
The Mariners' Museum of Newport News, Virginia, holds many objects from United States, including the ''Expressions of Freedom'' by Gwen Lux, the aluminum sculpture from the main dining room, purchased during the 1984 auction. 

At the National Museum of American History, “The Currents” mural by Raymond John Wendell is on display. Hildreth Meière cabin class lounge mural Mississippi, Father of Waters had also been relocated to the museum, but is not currently on display.

Propellers and fittings
The ship used four  manganese bronze propellers, two four-bladed screws outboard, and two inboard five-bladed. One of the four-bladed propellers is mounted at the entrance to the Intrepid Sea, Air & Space Museum in New York City, while the other is mounted outside the American Merchant Marine Museum on the grounds of the United States Merchant Marine Academy in Kings Point, New York.

The ship's bell is kept in the clock tower on the campus of Christopher Newport University in Newport News, Virginia. It is used to celebrate special events, including being rung by incoming freshman and by outgoing graduates.

One of the ship's horns stood on display for decades above the Rent-A-Tool building in Revere, Massachusetts, and has since been sold to a private collector in Texas for $8,000 in 2017.

The large collection of dining room furniture and other memorabilia that had been purchased during the 1984 auction, and incorporated at the Windmill Point Restaurant in Nags Head, North Carolina, was donated to the Mariners' Museum and Christopher Newport University in Newport News after the restaurant shut down in 2007. The chairs from the tourist class dining room are used in the Mariners' Museum cafe.

Speed records
With both the eastbound and westbound speed records, SS United States obtained the Blue Riband which marked the first time a US-flagged ship had held the record since  claimed the prize 100 years earlier. United States maintained a  crossing speed on the North Atlantic in a service career that lasted 17 years. The ship remained unchallenged for the Blue Riband throughout her career. During this period the fast trans-Atlantic passenger trade moved to air travel, and many regard the story of the Blue Riband as having ended with United States.
Her east-bound record has since been broken several times (first, in 1986, by Virgin Atlantic Challenger II), and her west-bound record was broken in 1990 by Destriero, but these vessels were not passenger-carrying ocean liners. The Hales Trophy itself was lost in 1990 to Hoverspeed Great Britain, setting a new eastbound speed record for a commercial vessel.

On screen appearances

Documentaries
The Superliners: Twilight of An Era (National Geographic 1985)
The SS United States: From Dream to Reality (1992, Mariner's Museum)
Floating Palaces (1996)
SS United States: Lady in Waiting (2008)
SS United States: Made in America (2013)
Inside The ABANDONED S.S United States (2021)

Motion picture cameos

Sabrina (1954)
Gentlemen Marry Brunettes (1955)
West Side Story (1961)
Bon Voyage! (1962)
Munster, Go Home! (1966)
Dead Man Down (2013)

Literature

Superliner S.S. United States, Henry Billings, The Viking Press (1953)
The Big Ship: The Story of the S.S. United States, Frank O. Braynard, Turner (1981), 
S.S. United States: The Story of America's Greatest Ocean Liner, William H. Miller, W.W. Norton & Company (1991), 
Flood Tide (novel), Clive Cussler, United States, Simon & Schuster (1997), Hardcover.
S.S. United States: Fastest Ship in the World, Frank Braynard & Robert Hudson Westover, Turner Publishing Company (2002), 
SS United States: America's Superliner, Les Streater, Maritime Publishing Co. (2011), 
Picture History of the SS United States, William H. Miller, Dover Publications (July 12, 2012), 
SS United States, Andrew Britton, The History Press (July 15, 2012), 
A Man and His Ship: America's Greatest Naval Architect and His Quest to Build the S.S. United States, Steven Ujifusa, Simon & Schuster; Reprint edition (June 4, 2013), 
The Last Great Race, The S.S. United States and the Blue Riband, Lawrence M. Driscoll, The Glencannon Press; First edition, first printing. (June 17, 2013) 
SS United States: Red, White, and Blue Riband, Forever, John Maxtone-Graham, W. W. Norton & Company; 1st edition (October 27, 2014), 
SS United States: Speed Queen of the Seas, William H. Miller, Amberley Publishing (March 24, 2015), 
SS United States: The View from Down Below, Robert Sturm, Independent Publisher (2015), 
Crossing On Time, David Macaulay, Roaring Brook Press; Illustrated edition (May 7, 2019), 
The Final Voyage: A time travel novel, Jürgen Sester, Bookrix; (November 2021),

See also

Related American passenger ships
SS Leviathan
SS Malolo (1927)
SS America (1939)
SS Santa Rosa (1958)

References

Further reading

External links

SS United States: Cruise Deck Plan
SS United States Conservancy, current owner of SS United States

SS United States Onboard Artwork: Hildreth Meière
Information on SS United States from vesselfinder.com This page gives a list of registered owners of the ship.
SS United States, archive of various stories from the united-states-lines.org website
SS United States , ss-united-states.com, an outdated conservation website
SS United States photographs, archive of the ssmaritime.com website
SS United States photographs, maritimematters.com website
2007 news article from USA Today
Inside the Abandoned S.S. United States, 2021 YouTube video
First Class Deck Plan 
Cabin Class Deck Plan 
Tourist Class Deck Plan 
1954 Deck Plans

|-

Ocean liners
Steamships of the United States
National Register of Historic Places in Philadelphia
Blue Riband holders
Historic American Engineering Record in Philadelphia
Passenger ships of the United States
Ships built in Newport News, Virginia
Ships of the United States Lines
Ships on the National Register of Historic Places in Pennsylvania
1951 ships
Type P6 ships